The Beaumont Drillers were a professional indoor football team. They played their home games at Ford Arena in Beaumont, Texas. They originally began playing as the Louisiana Rangers in the Indoor Professional Football League (IPFL) in 2000 when they replaced the Louisiana Bayou Beast. As the Rangers, they played their home games at the Rapides Parish Coliseum in Alexandria, Louisiana. After the league collapsed, the Rangers moved into the National Indoor Football League (NIFL). After two seasons, the franchise moved to Beaumont, Texas, and became the Drillers. The team left the NIFL in 2008 and played in the American Professional Football League in 2008 with new ownership. The team played most of their schedule, cancelling two home games. The team played in APFL Bowl VI, because of the Conroe Storm withdrawing, but lost.

Former Drillers Shockmain Davis, Pat Palmer and Chad Luttrell all spent time playing in the NFL.

Season-by-season 

|-
| colspan="6" align="center" | Louisiana Rangers (IPFL)
|-
|2000 || 9 || 7 || 0 || 5th League || —
|-
| colspan="6" align="center" | Louisiana Rangers (NIFL)
|-
|2001 || 5 || 9 || 0 || 5th Atlantic Southern || —
|-
|2002 || 8 || 6 || 0 || 1st Atlantic Eastern || Lost Round 1 (Ohio Valley)
|-
| colspan="6" align="center" | Beaumont Drillers (NIFL)
|-
|2003 || 6 || 8 || 0 || 4th Atlantic Southern || —
|-
|2004 || 8 || 6 || 0 || 3rd Atlantic Southern || —
|-
|2005 || 5 || 9 || 0 || 3rd Pacific Southern || Lost Round 1 (Odessa)
|-
|2006 || 8 || 6 || 0 || 2nd Pacific Southern || Lost Round 1 (Katy)
|-
|2007 || 6 || 2 || 0 || 1st Pacific Southern || —
|-
| colspan="6" align="center" | Beaumont Drillers (APFL)
|-
|2008 || 6 || 5 || 0 || 2nd Southern || Lost APFL Bowl VI
|-
!Totals || 61 || 58 || 0
|colspan="2"| (including playoffs)

2000 Louisiana Rangers IPFL schedule 
Week 1 – Louisiana Rangers 36, at Portland Prowlers 52
Week 2 – Mobile Seagulls 29, at Louisiana Rangers 43
Week 3 – Louisiana Rangers 42, at Shreveport-Bossier Bombers 29
Week 4 – Bye
Week 5 – Mississippi Fire Dogs 37, at Louisiana Rangers 50
Week 6 – Shreveport-Bossier Bombers 19, at Louisiana Rangers 39
Week 7 – Louisiana Rangers 40, at Omaha Beef 33
Week 8 – Louisiana Rangers 32, at Mobile Seagulls 3
Week 9 – Portland Prowlers 61, at Louisiana Rangers 55
Week 10 – Mississippi Fire Dogs 56, at Louisiana Rangers 44
Week 11 – Louisiana Rangers 48, at Idaho Stallions 52
Week 12 – Idaho Stallions 17, at Louisiana Rangers 54
Week 13 – Bye
Week 14 – Louisiana Rangers 34, at Mississippi Fire Dogs 53
Week 15 – Louisiana Rangers 13, at Mobile Seagulls 21
Week 16 – Louisiana Rangers 29, at Shreveport-Bossier Bombers 35
Week 17 – Omaha Beef 27, at Louisiana Rangers 35
Week 18 – Bye
Week 19 – Shreveport-Bossier Bombers 35, at Louisiana Rangers 60

References

American Professional Football League teams
American football teams in Texas
Sports in Beaumont, Texas
Defunct American football teams in Texas
2002 establishments in Texas
2008 disestablishments in Texas
American football teams established in 2002
American football teams disestablished in 2008